Saint Mary's Royal Church is a Roman Catholic parish church located on the / in the Brussels municipality of Schaerbeek, Belgium. Officially dedicated to Our Lady of the Assumption, it is popularly associated with Queen Louise-Marie, first Queen of the Belgians, as is the square where it is located, which earned it the title of "Royal".

This site is served by the Botanique/Kruidtuin metro station on lines 2 and 6 of the Brussels Metro.

History

Construction
The building was designed by the architect Henri Désiré Louis Van Overstraeten and built between 1845 and 1888 in an eclectic style combining neo-Romanesque and neo-Gothic elements with influences from Byzantine and Roman architecture. Following Van Overstraeten's death in 1849, his father-in-law Louis Roelandt took over the management of the works, then the architect Gustave Hansotte after Roelandt's passing in 1864. The windows were designed and created by the stained glass artist Jean-Baptiste Capronnier (1814–1891). Although unfinished, the church was opened to worship on 15 August 1853.

After Hansotte's death in 1866, the architects François Thomisse and Alexandre Struyven took over as directors of the site. The final acceptance of the completion works takes place on 11 January 1888. A long period of interior fittings then began, which continued well beyond the solemn consecration of the church, which took place on 14 October 1902, feast of Our Lady of the Rosary, by the archbishop of Mechelen Cardinal Goossens.

Repairs and protection
As early as 1870, the building required expensive repairs to remedy rainwater infiltration generated by repeated work interruptions. Despite punctual restoration work over the next seventy years, the deterioration continued after World War II. Following the fall of several stones on the street below it in 1963, the crown of the tower attached to the side of the church, designed by Hansotte, was demolished, and the church was ultimately closed in 1965, its condition considered too dangerous.

The building received protected status through a royal decree issued on 9 November 1976. It was the subject of a restoration campaign from 1982 to 1996. A fire that occurred on 8 September 1985, however, destroyed the already restored dome and roofs and abruptly interrupted the works. The restoration restarted in 1992 and ended in 1994, and the church finally reopened on 17 April 1996.

Description
Structurally, the body of the church is an octagon, the southern side of which opens onto the porch, and the northern side onto a rectangle which receives, in elevated form, the sanctuary, and in the basement, a large crypt. Eight pillars around the perimeter of an inner circle  in diameter form the framework of the building. A  ambulatory encircles this circular nave. Six chapels occupy the other sides of the octagon. The pillars are linked to each other by horseshoe arches. A staircase leads up to the sanctuary. To the right and left of the stairs, walking two flights down to the Romanesque-style crypt, with, on the lower floor, a "sub-crypt".

See also
 List of churches in Brussels
 Roman Catholicism in Belgium
 History of Brussels
 Belgium in "the long nineteenth century"

References

Explanatory notes

Notes

Bibliography
 Louis van Overstraeten, Architectonographie des Temples chrétiens, Mechelen, 1850.
 Jean Delsaux, L'église Ste-Marie à Bruxelles, une œuvre d'une ferveur et d'une probité artistique exceptionnelles, "Les Amis de l'église Ste-Marie, s. d., Brussels, 1968

External links

 Phillips: Sainte-Marie Royal Church
 Sacred Destinations: Église Sainte-Marie, Brussels
 Schaarbeek.be: Sinte-Mariakerk (Dutch/Flemish)

Roman Catholic churches in Brussels
Schaerbeek
Protected heritage sites in Brussels
Churches completed in 1885
19th-century Roman Catholic church buildings in Belgium
Eclectic architecture
Church buildings with domes